Calvetiidae is a family of bryozoans belonging to the order Cyclostomatida.

Genera:
 Calvetia Borg, 1944

References

Cyclostomatida